Euphilotes pallescens,  the pale blue, pallid blue or pallid dotted blue, is a species of butterfly of the family Lycaenidae. It is found in the United States in southeastern California, Nevada, southern Utah and northern Arizona.

The wingspan is 16–21 mm. The upperside of the males is pale blue, while the upperside of the females is grayish brown with gray overscales on the wing bases. The underside is almost white with black spots. There usually is an orange marginal hindwing band. Adults are on wing from July to September in one generation per year. They feed on the flower nectar of Eriogonum species.

The larvae feed on the flowers and fruits of Eriogonum species, including E. kearneyi, E. microthecum and E. plumatella. The larvae are tended by ants.

Subspecies
Euphilotes pallescens pallescens
Euphilotes pallescens arenamontana Austin, 1998 Sand Mountain blue 
Euphilotes pallescens elvirae (Mattoni, 1966)

References

Butterflies described in 1955
Euphilotes